Boreocingula is a genus of minute sea snails, marine gastropod mollusks or micromollusks in the family Rissoidae.

Species
Species within the genus Boreocingula include:

 Boreocingula castanea (Møller, 1842)
 Boreocingula globulus (Moller, 1842)
 Boreocingula martyni

References

Rissoidae